Gaeth was an American steam automobile manufactured in Cleveland, Ohio from 1902 until 1911.

Bicycle maker Paul Gaeth added stationary engines to his business, and made an experimental steam car in 1898. His gasoline cars were unusual in using a large 3-cylinder horizontal engine of 25/30 hp. Advertised as "the best $3500 car on the market", the 1909 model was a powerful 6423 cc 35/40 hp four-cylinder.

References

G.N. Georgano, Encyclopedia of American Automobile, (New York, E. P. Dutton & Co., 1968), p. 86.
Wise, David Burgess. The New Illustrated Encyclopedia of Automobiles

Defunct motor vehicle manufacturers of the United States
Vehicle manufacturing companies established in 1902
Vehicle manufacturing companies disestablished in 1911
Companies based in Ohio
Defunct companies based in Ohio
1902 establishments in Ohio
1911 disestablishments in Ohio